Patrick Michael Quinlan (died 8 November 2001) was an Irish academic and member of Seanad Éireann from 1957 to 1977.

He was born near Kilmallock, County Limerick. He completed his PhD at California Institute of Technology in 1949. He was professor of mathematical physics at University College Cork (UCC). He was a member of the governing body of UCC, and a fellow of the Institute of Advanced Studies from 1971. In 1967, he was awarded a Higher Doctorate, the DSc from the National University of Ireland and in 1978, he was elected a member of the Royal Irish Academy. He was a founder member of the National Committee for Theoretical and Applied Mechanics in 1983.

He was elected to the 9th Seanad in 1957 for the National University constituency. He was re-elected to the Seanad in 1961, 1965, 1969 and 1973. He did not contest the 1977 Seanad election.

He authored many publications, including A Dynamic Model of the Irish Economy (1961), and The Edge Function Method (1968).

References

20th-century births
2001 deaths
Irish physicists
Independent members of Seanad Éireann
Members of the 9th Seanad
Members of the 10th Seanad
Members of the 11th Seanad
Members of the 12th Seanad
Members of the 13th Seanad
Members of the Royal Irish Academy
Alumni of University College Cork
California Institute of Technology alumni
Place of death missing
Year of birth missing
Academics of University College Cork
Politicians from County Limerick
Members of Seanad Éireann for the National University of Ireland